Barronopsis floridensis is a species of funnel weaver in the spider family Agelenidae. It is found in the United States and Bahama Islands.

References

Agelenidae
Articles created by Qbugbot
Spiders described in 1954